Hempfield is an unincorporated community in Lancaster County, Pennsylvania, United States. Hempfield is a tiny locale in West Hempfield Township a few miles west of Lancaster, the county seat.

History
Hempfield Township was one of the original townships set off when the boundaries of Lancaster County were surveyed in 1729. At that time, it included the present areas of East Hempfield Township, West Hempfield Township, Manor Township, and the Boroughs of Columbia, Mountville, and East Petersburg.

Hempfield is said to be so named on account of the hemp fields that used to be in the area.

Notable people
Christian Strenge, fraktur artist

References

See also
 Hempfield High School

Unincorporated communities in Lancaster County, Pennsylvania
Unincorporated communities in Pennsylvania